James Donald (18 May 1917 – 3 August 1993) was a Scottish actor. Tall and thin, he specialised in playing authority figures, particularly military doctors.

Early life
Donald was born in Aberdeen, the fourth son of a Scottish Presbyterian minister. His mother died when he was 18 months old and his father remarried.

Donald grew up in Galashiels and was educated at Rossall School on Lancashire's Fylde coast. He briefly attended McGill University in Montreal, but due to asthma, he transferred to the University of Edinburgh.

Donald originally intended to be a teacher but seeing Sir Cedric Hardwicke and Dame Edith Evans in The Late Christopher Bean made him decide to be an actor.

He began seeing as many shows as possible and studied at the London Theatre Studio for two years. He made his stage debut in 1938 in The White Guard and he began to get work regularly on stage. He appeared in Twelfth Night with Michael Redgrave and understudied John Gielgud in King Lear. He toured the provinces in The Cherry Orchard.

War service
In 1939, Donald tried to enlist but a medical classified him as unfit for military service so he joined ENSA. He played minor roles in several war films, including Alibi (1942), In Which We Serve (1942), Went the Day Well? (1942), San Demetrio London (1943) and The Way Ahead (1944). He achieved fame on stage appearing in Present Laughter by Noël Coward. In 1943 he was signed by MGM.

After The Way Ahead in 1944, the British Army reversed its earlier decision and called up Donald. He joined the RASC before being assigned to British Army Intelligence where he typed up decoded enemy messages.

Acting career
After the war he resumed his acting career. On stage he was in The Eagle with Two Heads (1947) and You Never Can Tell (1948) In films, MGM loaned him to Gainsborough Studios for Broken Journey (1948). He was also in The Small Voice (1948) and MGM's Edward, My Son (1949).

Donald had a big success on stage in The Heiress (1949) with Ralph Richardson, Peggy Ashcroft and Donald Sinden. It led to Laurence Olivier's casting him in a production of Captain Caravallo (1950).

For films, he was Jean Kent's love interest in Trottie True (1949) and supported Jean Simmons in Cage of Gold (1950) and Googie Withers in White Corridors (1951).

Donald had the lead in a comedy Brandy for the Parson (1952) and supported Trevor Howard and Richard Attenborough in Gift Horse (1952). He played Mr Winkle in the 1952 film version of The Pickwick Papers.

He had the lead in The Net (1953) and was cast in his first Hollywood film in MGM's Beau Brummell (1954). The same studio hired him to play Theo Van Gogh in Lust for Life (1956). It was Donald's voice that read aloud the famous letters from the artist, played by Kirk Douglas, to his brother, which formed the narrative backbone of the film.

International work
He portrayed Major Clipton, the doctor who expresses grave doubts about the sanity of Colonel Nicholson's (Alec Guinness) efforts to build the bridge in order to show up his Japanese captors, in the war film The Bridge on the River Kwai (1957). He spoke the film's final words: "Madness! Madness!"

Donald was in much demand to play supporting roles in action and prisoner-of-war films: The Vikings (1958); Third Man on the Mountain (1959); Group Captain Ramsey, the Senior British Officer in The Great Escape (1963); King Rat (1965), a doctor in a POW camp; and Cast a Giant Shadow (1966). He played a colonel in a comedy The Jokers (1967) and had a part as a heroic scientist in Quatermass and the Pit (1967).

Donald starred in a 1960 television adaptation of A. J. Cronin's The Citadel and appeared regularly in many other television dramas in the UK and US. He starred in two episodes of Alfred Hitchcock Presents directed by Hitchcock himself: "Poison" (from the story by Roald Dahl) and "The Crystal Trench" (based on the story by A.E.W. Mason). In 1961, he played Prince Albert opposite Julie Harris's Queen Victoria, in the Hallmark Hall of Fame production of Laurence Housman's play Victoria Regina, for which he received an Emmy nomination.

He performed Write Me a Murder (1961) on Broadway.

Later life
Later film roles included Hannibal Brooks (1969), The Royal Hunt of the Sun (1969), David Copperfield (1969), Conduct Unbecoming (1975) and The Big Sleep (1978).

Death
Donald retired from acting in part because of a lifelong asthmatic condition. He grew grapes and made wine on his farm in Hampshire. He died of stomach cancer on 3 August 1993 in West Tytherley, Hampshire. He was survived by his wife Ann, and a stepson.

Filmography

Theatre & stage
"White Guard" (1938)
"Swords About the Cross" (1938)
"Weep for the Spring" (1939)
"Twelfth Night" (1939)
"King Lear" (1940)
"Thunder Rock" (1943)
"The Time of Your Life" (1943)
"Present Laughter" (1943)
"This Happy Breed" (1943)
"The Brothers Karamazov" (1946)
"The Eagle Has Two Heads" (1947)
"The Cherry Orchard" (1948)
"You Never Can Tell" (1948)
"The Heriress" (1949)
"Captain Carvallo" (1950)
"Peter Pan" (1952)
"Slightly Soiled" (1953)
"The Dark is Light Enough" (1954)
"The Gates of Summer"(1956)
"Face of a Hero" (1960)
"Write Me a Murder" (1961)
The Wings of the Dove" (1963)
"The Doctor's Dilemma" (1963)
"School for Scandal" (1970)
"The Marquise" (1971)
"Emperor Henry IV" (1973)

References

External links 
 Tribute to James Donald

 Obituary in The Independent
 Obituary in The New York Times

Alumni of the London Theatre Studio
Scottish male stage actors
Scottish male film actors
Scottish male television actors
1917 births
1993 deaths
People educated at Rossall School
Male actors from Aberdeen
20th-century Scottish male actors
Deaths from stomach cancer
British Army personnel of World War II
Royal Army Service Corps soldiers
Intelligence Corps soldiers
Deaths from cancer in England